Sabine Weiss may refer to:

Sabine Weiss (canoeist), Swiss slalom canoeist active in the late 1970s to the early 1980s
Sabine Weiss (photographer) (1924–2021), Swiss-French photographer
Sabine Weiss (politician) (born 1958), German lawyer and politician